Newchurch railway station, was an intermediate station situated on the edge of Newchurch village  on the line from Newport to Sandown incorporated by the Isle of Wight (Newport Junction) Railway in 1868, opened in 1875 and closed 81 years later. Despite its rural location a "respectable" number of families alighted at the simple station, "little more than a wooden hut". The nearest location to the site is a bungalow, Newchurch Crossing.

See also 

 List of closed railway stations in Britain

References

External links 
 Subterranea Britannica's page on Newchurch

Disused railway stations on the Isle of Wight
Former Isle of Wight Central Railway stations
Railway stations in Great Britain opened in 1875
Railway stations in Great Britain closed in 1956